Jangali Maharaj Road may refer to:

 Jangali Maharaj Road, Mumbai
 Jangali Maharaj Road, Pune